Merzlikin is a Russian masculine surname, its feminine counterpart is Merzlikina. Notable people with the surname include:

Andrey Merzlikin (born 1973), Russian actor
Elvis Merzļikins (born 1994), Latvian ice hockey goaltender

Russian-language surnames